Malum is an upcoming American horror film directed by Anthony DiBlasi, who co-wrote the film with Scott Poiley. It is a reboot/reimagining of the 2014 film Last Shift, also directed by DiBlasi. Malum stars Jessica Sula, Eric Olson, Chaney Morrow and Candice Coke.

Malum is slated for a theatrical release on March 31, 2023.

Cast
Cast list:

Production
Principal photography took place on location in an abandoned prison in downtown Louisville, Kentucky, from August to September 2022.

Release
Malum is slated for a theatrical release on March 31, 2023.

References

External links
 
 
 

2023 films
Upcoming English-language films
American horror films
2020s English-language films
2020s American films
Horror film remakes
Remakes of American films